The roast beef sandwich is a sandwich that is made out of sliced roast beef or sometimes beef loaf. It is sold at many diners in the United States, as well as fast food chains, such as Arby's, Rax Roast Beef, and Roy Rogers Restaurants. This style of sandwich often comes on a hamburger bun and may be topped with barbecue sauce and/or melted American cheese. The roast beef sandwich also commonly comprises bread, cold roast beef (either the leftovers from a homemade dinner or deli meat), lettuce, tomatoes, and mustard, although it would not be uncommon to find cheese, horseradish, fresh/powdered chili pepper and even in some cases red onion. Roast beef sandwiches may be served hot or cold, and are sometimes served open faced.

History
Some trace the origins of the modern (American-style) roast beef sandwich as far back as 1877, with the then little known "beefsteak toast" recipe: cold beef, bread and gravy dish.
In 1900, the dish was described by The Washington Post as "unattractive" and as "a tired ark in a gravy flood".
The dish gained popularity in the coming years and by 1931, some critics even went as far as to describe it as "a true taste of South Dakota".

By region
Roast beef sandwiches have been a specialty of the Boston area, in particular in the North Shore of Massachusetts,  since the early 1950s, typically served very rare, thinly sliced (sometimes referred to as shaved) and piled on an onion roll. Restaurants specializing in it include John's in Lynn, Londi's in Peabody, Mike's of Everett, Nick's of Beverly, Bill and Bob’s of Woburn, and Harrison's of North Andover.

In Brooklyn a small handful of establishments, beginning with Brennan & Carr in 1938, have served a variant of the sandwich.

Similar sandwiches

Beef on weck

The beef on weck is a sandwich found primarily in Western New York. It is made with roast beef on a kummelweck roll topped with salt and caraway seeds. The meat on the sandwich is traditionally served rare, thin cut, with the top bun getting a dip au jus and topped with horseradish.

Chivito sandwich

The chivito sandwich is a national dish in Uruguay, and consists primarily of a thin slice of filet mignon (churrasco beef), with mozzarella, tomatoes, mayonnaise, black or green olives, and commonly also bacon, fried or hard-boiled eggs and ham. It is served in a bun, often with a side of French fries. Other ingredients might be added into the sandwich such as red beets, peas, grilled or pan-fried red peppers, and slices of cucumber.

Corned beef sandwich

The corned beef sandwich is a sandwich prepared with corned beef. The salt beef style corned beef sandwiches are traditionally served with mustard and a pickle. In the United Kingdom, pickle is a common addition to a corned beef sandwich.

French dip

The French dip sandwich is a hot sandwich consisting of thinly sliced roast beef (or, sometimes, other meats) on a "French roll" or baguette. It is usually served au jus, that is, with beef juice from the cooking process. Beef broth or beef consommé is sometimes substituted. Despite the name, this American specialty is almost completely unknown in France, the name seeming to refer to the style of bread rather than an alleged French origin.

Pastrami on rye

The pastrami on rye is a classic sandwich made famous in the Jewish kosher delicatessens of New York City. First created in 1888 by Sussman Volk, who served it at his deli on Delancey Street in New York City. It became a favorite at other delis, served on rye bread and topped with spicy brown mustard. Delis in New York City, like Katz's Delicatessen, have become known for their Pastrami on rye sandwiches.

See also

 List of American sandwiches
 List of beef dishes
 List of sandwiches
 Steak sandwich
 Cheesesteak
 Bauru (sandwich)

References

External links

 "Hot Roast Beef Sandwiches", Food Network

American sandwiches
Beef sandwiches